Secret Games 3 is a 1994 American erotic thriller drama film directed by Gregory Dark and produced by Andrew W. Garroni. This film has music composed by Ashley Irwin, and starred Woody Brown, Rochelle Swanson, May Karasun and Dean Scofield in the lead roles.

Cast
 Woody 
Brown
 Rochelle Swanson
 May Karasun
 Dean Scofield
 Brenda Swanson
 Bob Delegall
 Mark Davenport
 Melinda A. Grieger

References

External links
 
 

1994 films
1990s erotic thriller films
1990s thriller drama films
American erotic thriller films
American thriller drama films
Films shot in California
Films set in the United States
1994 thriller films
1994 drama films
1990s English-language films
1990s American films
Films directed by Gregory Dark